Nicolas Seiwald (born 4 May 2001) is an Austrian professional footballer who plays as a midfielder for Austrian Bundesliga club Red Bull Salzburg and the Austria national team.

Club career

Early career
Seiwald began his career in 2009 with the youth academy of FC Red Bull Salzburg. He made his professional debut playing for Red Bull Salzburg's feeder team, Liefering, against WSG Wattens on 24 May 2019.

He made his debut for FC Red Bull Salzburg on 21 November 2020 when he was in the starting XI versus SK Sturm Graz. On 11 October 2022, he scored his first Champions League goal in a 1–1 away draw against Dinamo Zagreb.

International career
Seiwald has represented Austria in various youth levels.

He made his debut for Austria national football team on 12 November 2021 in a World Cup qualifier against Israel.

Career statistics

Club

International

Honours
Red Bull Salzburg Youth
Jugendliga U18: 2019

FC Liefering

Runner-up
 Austrian Football First League: 2021
Red Bull Salzburg 
Austrian Champion: 2021, 2022
Austrian Cup: 2021, 2021-22

References

External links 

2001 births 
Living people
Austrian footballers
Austria youth international footballers
Austria under-21 international footballers
Austria international footballers
Association football midfielders
FC Liefering players
FC Red Bull Salzburg players
Austrian Football Bundesliga players
2. Liga (Austria) players